John Quincy Adams II (September 22, 1833 – August 14, 1894) was an American politician who represented Quincy in the Massachusetts House of Representatives from 1866 to 1867, 1868 to 1869, 1871 to 1872, and from 1874 to 1875.

Adams served as a colonel in the Union Army during the American Civil War under Governor John Albion Andrew of Massachusetts. Later in life, he left the Republican Party in 1867 for the Democratic Party.

Early life
John Quincy Adams II was born on September 22, 1833, in Boston, Massachusetts. The 2nd of 7th children born to Charles Francis Adams and Abigail Brown Brooks.

He was the paternal grandson of the 6th United States president, John Quincy Adams (his namesake), and the great-grandson of the 2nd president, John Adams. His maternal grandfather was shipping magnate Peter Chardon Brooks (1767–1849).

He graduated from Harvard University in 1853, studied law, and two years later was admitted to the Suffolk County bar, and practiced in Boston. He followed his profession for a short time, then, becoming interested in agriculture, he established an experimental model farm of five hundred acres near Quincy, Massachusetts.

Career
During the Civil War he served as an aide-de-camp on the staff of Governor John Albion Andrew, first as a lieutenant colonel, and later as a colonel. During the war his duties included visiting Massachusetts units in the field and providing the governor status reports on their condition. In 1862, he made inspection visits to several Massachusetts units operating in North Carolina.

Adams served in several local offices in Quincy, including town meeting moderator, school board chairman and judge of the local court. He was elected to the Massachusetts state legislature as a Republican, but soon switched to the Democratic Party because of his dissatisfaction with Republican Reconstruction policies.  In addition to serving in the Massachusetts House of Representatives in 1865, 1867, 1870 and 1873, he was the unsuccessful Democratic nominee for Governor of Massachusetts in every year from 1867 to 1871. (Governors served one year terms until 1918.)

Adams received one vote for the Democratic nomination for President of the United States at the 1868 Democratic National Convention. In 1872, the faction of Democrats that refused to support Horace Greeley, the fusion candidate of Democrats and the Liberal Republican Party, nominated Charles O'Conor for president and Adams for vice president on the "Straight-Out Democratic" ticket. They declined, but their names remained on the ballot in some states.

In 1873, he was the unsuccessful nominee for lieutenant governor. After losing an election for lieutenant governor in 1876, Adams refused most further involvement in politics, though he was considered by Grover Cleveland for a cabinet position  in 1893. In 1877, he was made a member of the Harvard Corporation.

Personal life

In 1861, Adams married Frances "Fanny" Cadwalader Crowninshield (1839–1911), daughter of George Crowninshield (1812–1857) and Harriet Sears Crowninshield (1809–1873) of the politically powerful Crowninshield family.  Fanny was the granddaughter of former United States Secretary of the Navy under presidents Madison and Monroe, Benjamin Williams Crowninshield. Their children were:

 John Quincy Adams III. (1862–1876), who died young.
 George Caspar Adams (1863–1900), who was the head coach of the Harvard University football program.
 Charles Francis Adams III (1866–1954), who served as Secretary of the Navy, and who married Frances Lovering.
 Frances "Fanny" C. Adams (1873–1876), who died in childhood.
 Arthur Charles Adams (1877–1943), who served as vice president of the Adams Trust Company, the Colony Trust and the New England Trust Company.
 Abigail "Hitty" Adams (1879–1974), who married Robert Homans in 1907.

Adams died at age 60 in Wollaston, Massachusetts on August 14, 1894. He was buried at Mount Wollaston Cemetery in Quincy. His widow died in 1911, and left an estate worth $1,200,000 to their three surviving children.

Descendants
Through his daughter, Abigail, he was the grandfather of George Casper Homans (1910–1989), a sociologist and the founder of behavioral sociology and the Social Exchange Theory.

Family tree

See also
 1868 Massachusetts legislature
 1874 Massachusetts legislature

References

Attribution

External links
 

1833 births
1894 deaths
Harvard University alumni
Adams political family
Crowninshield family
People of Massachusetts in the American Civil War
Massachusetts Republicans
Massachusetts Democrats
Members of the Massachusetts House of Representatives
Massachusetts lawyers
Massachusetts state court judges
Politicians from Quincy, Massachusetts
Union Army colonels
1872 United States vice-presidential candidates